The 1970 Northern Illinois Huskies football team represented Northern Illinois University as an independent during the 1970 NCAA University Division football season. Led by Doc Urich in his second and final year as head coach, the Huskies compiled a record of 3–7. Northern Illinois played home games at Huskie Stadium in DeKalb, Illinois.

Schedule

References

Northern Illinois
Northern Illinois Huskies football seasons
Northern Illinois Huskies football